This is a list of the number-one hits of 2010 on FIMI's Italian Singles and Albums Charts.

See also
2010 in music
List of number-one hits in Italy

External links
FIMI archives
ItalianCharts.com

Number-one hits
Italy
2010

it:Classifica FIMI Artisti#Liste degli album al numero 1